

313001–313100 

|-bgcolor=#f2f2f2
| colspan=4 align=center | 
|}

313101–313200 

|-id=116
| 313116 Pálvenetianer ||  || Pál Venetianer (born 1935), a Hungarian molecular biologist and biochemist. || 
|}

313201–313300 

|-bgcolor=#f2f2f2
| colspan=4 align=center | 
|}

313301–313400 

|-bgcolor=#f2f2f2
| colspan=4 align=center | 
|}

313401–313500 

|-bgcolor=#f2f2f2
| colspan=4 align=center | 
|}

313501–313600 

|-bgcolor=#f2f2f2
| colspan=4 align=center | 
|}

313601–313700 

|-bgcolor=#f2f2f2
| colspan=4 align=center | 
|}

313701–313800 

|-bgcolor=#f2f2f2
| colspan=4 align=center | 
|}

313801–313900 

|-id=892
| 313892 Furnish || 2004 JF || James F. Furnish (1950–2021) was a commercial fisherman and owner of the Hylah Ruth of Astoria, Oregon. He fished from California to Alaska, and the Columbia River for fish, crab, and a digger of razor clams. Furnish was actively involved with community government and school issues. || 
|}

313901–314000 

|-id=921
| 313921 Daassou ||  || Ahmed Daassou (born 1981), who has been a Professor  at Cadi Ayyad University in Morocco || 
|}

References 

313001-314000